Latonigena is a genus of South American ground spiders that was first described by Eugène Simon in 1893.

Species
 it contains ten species:
Latonigena auricomis Simon, 1893 (type) – Brazil, Uruguay, Argentina
Latonigena beni Ott, Rodrigues & Brescovit, 2012 – Bolivia, Brazil
Latonigena colombo Ott, Rodrigues & Brescovit, 2012 – Brazil
Latonigena lami Ott, Rodrigues & Brescovit, 2012 – Brazil, Argentina
Latonigena pampa López Carrión & Grismado, 2014 – Argentina
Latonigena pittieri López Carrión & Grismado, 2014 – Venezuela
Latonigena santana Ott, Rodrigues & Brescovit, 2012 – Brazil, Argentina
Latonigena sapiranga Ott, Rodrigues & Brescovit, 2012 – Brazil
Latonigena taim Ott, Rodrigues & Brescovit, 2012 – Brazil
Latonigena turvo Ott, Rodrigues & Brescovit, 2012 – Brazil, Argentina

References

Araneomorphae genera
Gnaphosidae
Spiders of South America
Taxa named by Eugène Simon